Grant Goegan (born 15 October 1955) is an Italian ice hockey player. He competed in the men's tournament at the 1984 Winter Olympics.

References

External links
 

1955 births
Living people
Olympic ice hockey players of Italy
Ice hockey people from British Columbia
Ice hockey players at the 1984 Winter Olympics
Sportspeople from Victoria, British Columbia